Shalom Zysman (born 14 March 1914, died 12 February 1967) was an Israeli politician who served as a member of the Knesset for the General Zionists between 1951 and 1955.

Biography
Born in Żelechów in the Russian Empire (today in Poland), Zysman was educated at a gymnasium, before studying law at the University of Warsaw.

He made aliyah to Mandatory Palestine, where he joined the Haganah and was amongst the founders of Bamahane, the Haganah (and now IDF) publication. During World War II he was a sergeant major in the Jewish Brigade, and fought in the Western Desert in North Africa, and on the Italian front. In the 1948 Arab–Israeli War he was a major, and deputy head of the publicity department. He published a book, Know Your Weapon.

In 1951, he was elected to the Knesset on the General Zionists' list, but lost his seat in the 1955 elections. In the same year he was elected to Ramat Gan city council and became the city's deputy mayor. Zysman also served as chairman of the Israeli branch of Maccabi's directorate, as well as being a member of the World Maccabi Union's central committee. He chaired the Israeli Olympic Committee, and was a director of the Asian Federation for Sports.

He died in 1967 at the age of 52.

External links

1914 births
1967 deaths
People from Garwolin County
University of Warsaw alumni
Polish emigrants to Israel
Jews in Mandatory Palestine
General Zionists politicians
Haganah members
British Army personnel of World War II
Israeli soldiers
Members of the 2nd Knesset (1951–1955)
Mandatory Palestine military personnel of World War II
Jewish Brigade personnel